The 2023 U Sports Women's Volleyball Championship was held March 17–19, 2023, in Vancouver, British Columbia, to determine a national champion for the 2022–23 U Sports women's volleyball season. In a match between the two most recent champions, the host UBC Thunderbirds defeated the top-seeded Trinity Western Spartans to win the program's 13th national championship.

Host
The tournament was played at War Memorial Gymnasium at the University of British Columbia. This was the third time that UBC had hosted the tournament with the most recent occurring in 1983. UBC had previously been awarded the hosting duties for the 2021 championship, but that event was cancelled due to the COVID-19 pandemic in Canada.

Participating teams

Championship bracket

Bronze medal match

Gold medal match

Consolation bracket

References

External links 
 Tournament Web Site

U Sports volleyball
2023 in women's volleyball
University of British Columbia